George B. Harper Sr. (December 5, 1918 – March 1, 1988) was an American Republican Party politician who served in the New Jersey Senate from 1954 to 1964. He was the son of baseball pitcher Harry Harper.

A 1941 graduate of Princeton University, Harper served in the New Jersey Senate from 1954 to 1964, representing Sussex County. He resigned from office to become the New Jersey State Auditor, serving in that role until 1981. Harper died on March 1, 1988, at his home in the Layton section of Sandyston Township.

References

1918 births
1988 deaths
Republican Party New Jersey state senators
Majority leaders of the New Jersey Senate
People from Sussex County, New Jersey
Presidents of the New Jersey Senate
Princeton University alumni
20th-century American politicians